Nenad Injac (born 4 September 1985) is a Serbian former football forward.

Career
Born in Belgrade, SR Serbia, he previously played for FK Radnički Jugopetrol, FK Železničar Beograd, OFK Mladenovac, FK Borac Čačak, FC Amkar Perm, FC Volga Nizhny Novgorod, OFK Beograd, Al-Ansar, Bežanija, Atyrau, Rad, Voždovac and Ergotelis.

References

External sources
 Profile at Srbijafudbal
 Nenad Injac Stats at Utakmica.rs

1985 births
Living people
Footballers from Belgrade
Serbian footballers
Serbian expatriate footballers
Serbian SuperLiga players
Russian Premier League players
Kazakhstan Premier League players
Uzbekistan Super League players
Armenian Premier League players
Football League (Greece) players
Saudi Professional League players
FK Radnički Beograd players
OFK Mladenovac players
FK Borac Čačak players
FC Amkar Perm players
OFK Beograd players
FC Volga Nizhny Novgorod players
FK Bežanija players
Al-Ansar FC (Medina) players
FK Rad players
FK Voždovac players
FK Zemun players
Ergotelis F.C. players
FC Atyrau players
FC Urartu players
Navbahor Namangan players
FK Brodarac players
Association football forwards
Serbian expatriate sportspeople in Russia
Serbian expatriate sportspeople in Saudi Arabia
Serbian expatriate sportspeople in Kazakhstan
Serbian expatriate sportspeople in Greece
Serbian expatriate sportspeople in Uzbekistan
Expatriate footballers in Russia
Expatriate footballers in Saudi Arabia
Expatriate footballers in Kazakhstan
Expatriate footballers in Greece
Expatriate footballers in Uzbekistan